"You Know My Name (Look Up the Number)" is a song by the English rock band the Beatles originally released as the B-side of the single "Let It Be" on 6 March 1970. Although first issued with their final single (and the penultimate single in the United States), it was recorded in four separate sessions beginning with three in May and June 1967, with one final recording session conducted in April 1969. The song features a saxophone part played by Brian Jones of the Rolling Stones.

Composition
The song is a music hall comedy number. John Lennon came up with the lyric/title after seeing a phone book. He said:

McCartney once told Beatles recording analyst Mark Lewisohn, "[People] are only just discovering things like 'You Know My Name (Look Up the Number)'—probably my favourite Beatles' track!" He went on to explain:

The lounge section includes a reference to Denis O'Dell, associate producer on the A Hard Day's Night film, whom Lennon had also worked with on How I Won the War. Partway through the song, Lennon introduces McCartney as "Denis O'Bell". The reference prompted numerous telephone calls to O'Dell's home by fans who said things such as, "We know your name and now we've got your number."

Musical structure
The song is in the key of D. The "You know" involves F–D melody notes against a I (D chord). A point of interest is the raised A melody note against a D/F chord on "name", "three" and "name". A significant moment is the Tonicization of the dominant with the use of vii7/V chord (Gdim) as part of the progression to V7 (A7 chord on "You know my name") and I (D chord after "number") that closes the verse. The song is also notable for use of the 5th chord tone on the VII chord to produce extra dissonance.

Recording
All four Beatles participated in the first three recording sessions on 17 May, 7 and 8 June 1967. A saxophone part, played by Brian Jones of the Rolling Stones, was recorded on 8 June.

The recording of the song was left unfinished and untouched until 30 April 1969 when, with the help of Mal Evans, Lennon and McCartney laid down all the vocal tracks and added additional sound effects. George Harrison and Ringo Starr did not participate in this last session. Nick Webb, second engineer on 30 April session, described it this way:

Release
Although eventually released as a Beatles song, "You Know My Name (Look Up the Number)" was nearly issued as the A-side of a Plastic Ono Band single. Lennon was determined to have this song and "What's the New Mary Jane" (a Beatles outtake from The Beatles sessions recorded by Lennon and Yoko Ono with Harrison in August 1968) released, and he arranged for Apple to issue both songs on a Plastic Ono Band single. On 26 November 1969, four months after contributor Brian Jones drowned in his swimming pool, Lennon edited "You Know My Name (Look Up the Number)", reducing the length from 6:08 to 4:19, a more suitable time for a single. The Plastic Ono Band single was given an Apple catalogue number (Apples 1002) and British release date (5 December 1969). In January 1970, Apple issued a press statement, describing the record as Lennon and Ono singing and backed by "many of the greatest show business names of today" which the press believed was a thinly disguised reference to the Beatles. The record was cancelled before it was issued.

In March 1970, the song was released as the B-side to the Beatles' single, "Let It Be", but mistitled as "You Know My Name (Look Up My Number)" on the label of the record itself (the correct title appeared on the record sleeve, however). The original Plastic Ono Band single catalogue number is visible, though scratched out, in the runout groove of the original British pressings of the "Let It Be" single. "What's the New Mary Jane" was not officially issued by the Beatles until the release of Anthology 3 in 1996, although the song previously appeared on several bootleg records.

"You Know My Name (Look Up the Number)" was the last Beatles song from the group's official canon to be included on an album, issued on an LP for the first time on Rarities (which had been included as a bonus disc in the British and American boxed set, The Beatles Collection in 1978, and released separately as an album in the United Kingdom in 1979). The first American album to contain "You Know My Name (Look Up the Number)" was the US version of Rarities, which was issued by Capitol Records in 1980. The first CD version was issued in 1988 on the Past Masters, Volume Two compilation.

The record was available only in mono until 1996, when an extended stereo mix was finally issued on Anthology 2. However, while this mix restores portions of the song, it omits others that were issued on the original mono single, causing considerable differences between the mono and stereo versions of the track. For example, the ending of the stereo version has an early fade out, whereas the mono version does not fade.

Personnel
Personnel per Ian MacDonald and Mark Lewisohn, except where noted.

The Beatles
John Lennon – lead vocals, backing vocals, spoken vocals, guitar, maracas, sound effects
Paul McCartney – lead vocals, piano, bass, handclaps, sound effects
George Harrison – lead guitar, vibraphone
Ringo Starr – drums, timbales, bongos

Additional musicians
Brian Jones – alto saxophone
Mal Evans – sound effects (spade in gravel)

Notes

References

External links
 

1970 songs
The Beatles songs
Song recordings produced by George Martin
Novelty songs
Experimental rock songs
Songs written by Lennon–McCartney
Apple Records singles
Songs published by Northern Songs
Songs about telephones
Comedy rock songs
1970 singles